Antonie Philips van Leeuwenhoek  (24 October 1632 – 26 August 1723) was a Dutch microbiologist and microscopist in the Golden Age of Dutch science and technology. A largely self-taught man in science, he is commonly known as "the Father of Microbiology", and one of the first microscopists and microbiologists. Van Leeuwenhoek is best known for his pioneering work in microscopy and for his contributions toward the establishment of microbiology as a scientific discipline.

Raised in Delft, Dutch Republic, van Leeuwenhoek worked as a draper in his youth and founded his own shop in 1654. He became well recognized in municipal politics and developed an interest in lensmaking. In the 1670s, he started to explore microbial life with his microscope. This was one of the notable achievements of the Golden Age of Dutch exploration and discovery.

Using single-lensed microscopes of his own design and make, van Leeuwenhoek was the first to observe and to experiment with microbes, which he originally referred to as dierkens, diertgens or diertjes (Dutch for "small animals" [translated into English as animalcules, from Latin animalculum = "tiny animal"]). He was the first to relatively determine their size. Most of the "animalcules" are now referred to as unicellular organisms, although he observed multicellular organisms in pond water. He was also the first to document microscopic observations of muscle fibers, bacteria, spermatozoa, red blood cells, crystals in gouty tophi, and among the first to see blood flow in capillaries. Although van Leeuwenhoek did not write any books, he described his discoveries in letters to the Royal Society, which published many of his letters, and to persons in several European countries.

Early life and career

Antonie van Leeuwenhoek was born in Delft, Dutch Republic, on 24 October 1632. On 4 November, he was baptized as Thonis. His father, Philips Antonisz van Leeuwenhoek, was a basket maker who died when Antonie was only five years old. His mother, Margaretha (Bel van den Berch), came from a well-to-do brewer's family. She remarried Jacob Jansz Molijn, a painter. Antonie had four older sisters: Margriet, Geertruyt, Neeltje, and Catharina. When he was around ten years old his step-father died. He attended school in Warmond for a short time before being sent to live in Benthuizen with his uncle, an attorney.  At the age of 16 he became a bookkeeper's apprentice at a linen-draper's shop in Amsterdam, which was owned by the Scot William Davidson. Van Leeuwenhoek left there after six years.

Van Leeuwenhoek married Barbara de Mey in July 1654, with whom he fathered one surviving daughter, Maria (four other children died in infancy). That same year he returned to Delft, where he would live and study for the rest of his life. He opened a draper's shop, which he ran throughout the 1650s. His wife died in 1666, and in 1671, van Leeuwenhoek remarried to Cornelia Swalmius with whom he had no children. His status in Delft had grown throughout the years. In 1660 he received a lucrative job as chamberlain for the assembly chamber of the Delft sheriffs in the city hall, a position which he would hold for almost 40 years. In 1669 he was appointed as a land surveyor by the court of Holland; at some time he combined it with another municipal job, being the official "wine-gauger" of Delft and in charge of the city wine imports and taxation.

Van Leeuwenhoek was a contemporary of another famous Delft citizen, the painter Johannes Vermeer, who was baptized just four days earlier. It has been suggested that he is the man portrayed in two Vermeer paintings of the late 1660s, The Astronomer and The Geographer, but others argue that there appears to be little physical similarity. Because they were both relatively important men in a city with only 24,000 inhabitants, it is possible that they were at least acquaintances; van Leeuwenhoek acted as the executor of Vermeer's will after the painter died in 1675.

Microscopic study

While running his draper shop, van Leeuwenhoek wanted to see the quality of the thread better than what was possible using the magnifying lenses of the time. He developed an interest in lensmaking, although few records exist of his early activity. By placing the middle of a small rod of soda lime glass in a hot flame, one can pull the hot section apart to create two long whiskers of glass. Then, by reinserting the end of one whisker into the flame, a very small, high-quality glass lens is created. Significantly, a May 2021 neutron tomography study of a high-magnification Leeuwenhoek microscope captured images of the short glass stem characteristic of this lens creation method. For lower magnifications he also made ground lenses. To help keep his methods confidential he apparently intentionally encouraged others to think grinding was his primary or only lens construction method.

Recognition by the Royal Society
After developing his method for creating powerful lenses and applying them to the study of the microscopic world, van Leeuwenhoek introduced his work to his friend, the prominent Dutch physician Reinier de Graaf. When the Royal Society in London published the groundbreaking work of an Italian lensmaker in their journal Philosophical Transactions of the Royal Society, de Graaf wrote to the editor of the journal, Henry Oldenburg, with a ringing endorsement of van Leeuwenhoek's microscopes which, he claimed, "far surpass those which we have hitherto seen". In response, in 1673 the society published a letter from van Leeuwenhoek that included his microscopic observations on mold, bees, and lice.

Van Leeuwenhoek's work fully captured the attention of the Royal Society, and he began corresponding regularly with the society regarding his observations. At first he had been reluctant to publicize his findings, regarding himself as a businessman with little scientific, artistic, or writing background, but de Graaf urged him to be more confident in his work. By the time van Leeuwenhoek died in 1723, he had written some 190 letters to the Royal Society, detailing his findings in a wide variety of fields, centered on his work in microscopy. He only wrote letters in his own colloquial Dutch; he never published a proper scientific paper in Latin. He strongly preferred to work alone, distrusting the sincerity of those who offered their assistance. The letters were translated into Latin or English by Henry Oldenburg, who had learned Dutch for this very purpose. He was also the first to use the word animalcules to translate the Dutch words that Leeuwenhoek used to describe microorganisms. Despite the initial success of van Leeuwenhoek's relationship with the Royal Society, soon relations became severely strained. His credibility was questioned when he sent the Royal Society a copy of his first observations of microscopic single-celled organisms dated 9 October 1676. Previously, the existence of single-celled organisms was entirely unknown. Thus, even with his established reputation with the Royal Society as a reliable observer, his observations of microscopic life were initially met with some skepticism.

Eventually, in the face of van Leeuwenhoek's insistence, the Royal Society arranged for Alexander Petrie, minister to the English Reformed Church in Delft; Benedict Haan, at that time Lutheran minister at Delft; and Henrik Cordes, then Lutheran minister at the Hague, accompanied by Sir Robert Gordon and four others, to determine whether it was in fact van Leeuwenhoek's ability to observe and reason clearly, or perhaps, the Royal Society's theories of life that might require reform. Finally in 1677, van Leeuwenhoek's observations were fully acknowledged by the Royal Society.

Antonie van Leeuwenhoek was elected to the Royal Society in February 1680 on the nomination of William Croone, a then-prominent physician. Van Leeuwenhoek was "taken aback" by the nomination, which he considered a high honor, although he did not attend the induction ceremony in London, nor did he ever attend a Royal Society meeting.

Scientific fame
By the end of the seventeenth century, van Leeuwenhoek had a virtual monopoly on microscopic study and discovery. His contemporary Robert Hooke, an early microscope pioneer, bemoaned that the field had come to rest entirely on one man's shoulders. He was visited over the years by many notable individuals, such as the Russian Tsar Peter the Great. To the disappointment of his guests, van Leeuwenhoek refused to reveal the cutting-edge microscopes he relied on for his discoveries, instead showing visitors a collection of average-quality lenses.

Van Leeuwenhoek was visited by Leibniz, William III of Orange and his wife, Mary II of England, and the burgemeester (mayor) Johan Huydecoper of Amsterdam, the latter being very interested in collecting and growing plants for the Hortus Botanicus Amsterdam, and all gazed at the tiny creatures. In 1698, van Leeuwenhoek was invited to visit the Tsar Peter the Great on his boat. On this occasion van Leeuwenhoek presented the Tsar with an "eel-viewer", so Peter could study blood circulation whenever he wanted.

Techniques and discoveries
Antonie van Leeuwenhoek made more than 500 optical lenses. He also created at least 25 single-lens microscopes, of differing types, of which only nine have survived. These microscopes were made of silver or copper frames, holding hand-made lenses. Those that have survived are capable of magnification up to 275 times. It is suspected that van Leeuwenhoek possessed some microscopes that could magnify up to 500 times. Although he has been widely regarded as a dilettante or amateur, his scientific research was of remarkably high quality.

The single-lens microscopes of van Leeuwenhoek were relatively small devices, the largest being about 5 cm long. They are used by placing the lens very close in front of the eye, while looking in the direction of the Sun. The other side of the microscope had a pin, where the sample was attached in order to stay close to the lens. There were also three screws to move the pin and the sample along three axes: one axis to change the focus, and the two other axes to navigate through the sample.

Van Leeuwenhoek maintained throughout his life that there are aspects of microscope construction "which I only keep for myself", in particular his most critical secret of how he made the lenses. For many years no one was able to reconstruct van Leeuwenhoek's design techniques, but in 1957, C. L. Stong used thin glass thread fusing instead of polishing, and successfully created some working samples of a van Leeuwenhoek design microscope. Such a method was also discovered independently by A. Mosolov and A. Belkin at the Russian Novosibirsk State Medical Institute. In May 2021 researchers in the Netherlands published a non-destructive neutron tomography study of a Leeuwenhoek microscope. One image in particular shows a Stong/Mosolov-type spherical lens with a single short glass stem attached (Fig. 4). Such lenses are created by pulling an extremely thin glass filament, breaking the filament, and briefly fusing the filament end. The nuclear tomography article notes this lens creation method was first devised by Robert Hooke rather than Leeuwenhoek, which is ironic given Hooke's subsequent surprise at Leeuwenhoek's findings.

Van Leeuwenhoek used samples and measurements to estimate numbers of microorganisms in units of water. He also made good use of the huge advantage provided by his method. He studied a broad range of microscopic phenomena, and shared the resulting observations freely with groups such as the British Royal Society. Such work firmly established his place in history as one of the first and most important explorers of the microscopic world. Van Leeuwenhoek was one of the first people to observe cells, much like Robert Hooke.

Van Leeuwenhoek's main discoveries are:
 infusoria (protists in modern zoological classification), in 1674
 bacteria, (e.g., large Selenomonads from the human mouth), in 1683
 the vacuole of the cell
 spermatozoa, in 1677
 the banded pattern of muscular fibers, in 1682

In 1687, van Leeuwenhoek reported his research on the coffee bean. He roasted the bean, cut it into slices and saw a spongy interior. The bean was pressed, and an oil appeared. He boiled the coffee with rain water twice and set it aside.

Van Leeuwenhoek has been attributed as the first person to use a histological stain to color specimens observed under the microscope using saffron.

Like Robert Boyle and Nicolaas Hartsoeker, van Leeuwenhoek was interested in dried cochineal, trying to find out if the dye came from a berry or an insect.

Van Leeuwenhoek's religion was "Dutch Reformed" Calvinist. He often referred with reverence to the wonders God designed in making creatures great and small, and believed that his discoveries were merely further proof of the wonder of creation.

Legacy and recognition
By the end of his life, van Leeuwenhoek had written approximately 560 letters to the Royal Society and other scientific institutions concerning his observations and discoveries. Even during the last weeks of his life, van Leeuwenhoek continued to send letters full of observations to London. The last few contained a precise description of his own illness. He suffered from a rare disease, an uncontrolled movement of the midriff, which now is named van Leeuwenhoek's disease. He died at the age of 90, on 26 August 1723, and was buried four days later in the Oude Kerk in Delft.

In 1981, the British microscopist Brian J. Ford found that van Leeuwenhoek's original specimens had survived in the collections of the Royal Society of London. They were found to be of high quality, and all were well preserved. Ford carried out observations with a range of single-lens microscopes, adding to our knowledge of van Leeuwenhoek's work. In Ford's opinion, Leeuwenhoek remained imperfectly understood, the popular view that his work was crude and undisciplined at odds with the evidence of conscientious and painstaking observation. He constructed rational and repeatable experimental procedures and was willing to oppose received opinion, such as spontaneous generation, and he changed his mind in the light of evidence.

On his importance in the history of microbiology and science in general, the British biochemist Nick Lane wrote that he was "the first even to think of looking—certainly, the first with the power to see." His experiments were ingenious and he was "a scientist of the highest calibre", attacked by people who envied him or "scorned his unschooled origins", not helped by his secrecy about his methods.

The Antoni van Leeuwenhoek Hospital in Amsterdam, named after van Leeuwenhoek, is specialized in oncology. In 2004, a public poll in the Netherlands to determine the greatest Dutchman ("De Grootste Nederlander") named van Leeuwenhoek the 4th-greatest Dutchman of all time.

On 24 October 2016, Google commemorated the 384th anniversary of van Leeuwenhoek's birth with a Doodle that depicted his discovery of "little animals" or animalcules, now known as bacteria.

The Leeuwenhoek Medal, Leeuwenhoek Lecture, Leeuwenhoek crater, Leeuwenhoeckia, Levenhookia (a genus in the family Stylidiaceae), Leeuwenhoekiella (an aerobic bacterial genus), and the scientific publication Antonie van Leeuwenhoek: International Journal of General and Molecular Microbiology are named after him.

See also
 Animalcule
 Regnier de Graaf
 Dutch Golden Age
 History of microbiology
 History of microscopy
 History of the microscope
 Robert Hooke
 Microscopic discovery of microorganisms
 Microscopic scale
 Science and technology in the Dutch Republic
 Scientific Revolution
 Nicolas Steno
 Jan Swammerdam
 Timeline of microscope technology
 Johannes Vermeer

Notes

References

Sources
 Cobb, Matthew: Generation: The Seventeenth-Century Scientists Who Unraveled the Secrets of Sex, Life, and Growth. (US: Bloomsbury, 2006)
 Cobb, Matthew: The Egg and Sperm Race: The Seventeenth-Century Scientists Who Unlocked the Secrets of Sex and Growth. (London: Simon & Schuster, 2006)
 Davids, Karel: The Rise and Decline of Dutch Technological Leadership: Technology, Economy and Culture in the Netherlands, 1350–1800 [2 vols.]. (Brill, 2008)
 
 
 Ford, Brian J.: Single Lens: The Story of the Simple Microscope. (London: William Heinemann, 1985, 182 pp)
 Ford, Brian J.: The Revealing Lens: Mankind and the Microscope. (London: George Harrap, 1973, 208 pp)
 Fournier, Marian: The Fabric of Life: The Rise and Decline of Seventeenth-Century Microscopy (Johns Hopkins University Press, 1996)
 
 
 
 Ratcliff, Marc J.: The Quest for the Invisible: Microscopy in the Enlightenment. (Ashgate, 2009, 332 pp)
 Robertson, Lesley; Backer, Jantien et al.: Antoni van Leeuwenhoek: Master of the Minuscule. (Brill, 2016)
 
 
 Struik, Dirk J.: The Land of Stevin and Huygens: A Sketch of Science and Technology in the Dutch Republic during the Golden Century (Studies in the History of Modern Science).  (Springer, 1981, 208 pp)
 
 Wilson, Catherine: The Invisible World: Early Modern Philosophy and the Invention of the Microscope. (Princeton University Press, 1997)

External links

 Leeuwenhoek's letters to the Royal Society
 The Correspondence of Anthonie van Leeuwenhoek in EMLO
 Lens on Leeuwenhoek (site on Leeuwenhoek's life and observations)
 Vermeer connection website
 University of California, Berkeley article on van Leeuwenhoek
 
 
 Retrospective paper on the Leeuwenhoek research by Brian J. Ford.
 Images seen through a van Leeuwenhoek microscope by Brian J. Ford.
 Instructions on making a van Leeuwenhoek Microscope Replica by Alan Shinn

 
1632 births
1723 deaths
17th-century Dutch businesspeople
17th-century Dutch inventors
17th-century Dutch naturalists
17th-century Dutch people
17th-century Dutch scientists
18th-century Dutch people
Burials at the Oude Kerk, Delft
Dutch Calvinist and Reformed Christians
Dutch microbiologists
Dutch naturalists
Fellows of the Royal Society
Microscopists
People from Delft
Protistologists
Dutch scientific instrument makers